Austin–Bergstrom International Airport, or ABIA , is a Class C international airport in Austin, Texas, United States, serving the Greater Austin metropolitan area.

It is on the site of what was Bergstrom Air Force Base, named after Captain John August Earl Bergstrom, an officer who was the first person from Austin to be killed in World War II. The base was decommissioned in the early 1990s, and the land reverted to the city, which used it to replace Robert Mueller Municipal Airport as Austin's main airport in 1999. The airport is the third busiest in Texas, after Dallas/Fort Worth and Houston–Intercontinental. , there are 510 arrivals and departures on the typical weekday to 76 destinations in North America and Europe.

History

Beginnings 
In 1942, the city of Austin purchased land and donated the land to the Federal government of the United States for a military installation, with the stipulation that the city would get the land back when the government no longer needed it. This land became Bergstrom Air Force Base. Del Valle Airfield was activated on September 19, 1942, on  leased from the City of Austin. The name of the base was changed to Bergstrom Army Airfield (AAF) in March 1943 in honor of Captain John August Earl Bergstrom, a reservist in the 19th Bombardment Group, who was killed at Clark Field, Philippines in 1941. He was the first Austinite killed in World War II. With the separation of the United States Air Force and United States Army in September 1947, the name again changed to Bergstrom Air Force Base. It would have this name until it was decommissioned in the early 1990s, with all military aviation ceasing in 1995 after more than 50 years.

As Austin was quickly outgrowing the old Robert Mueller Municipal Airport, the city began considering options for a new airport as early as 1971, when the Federal Aviation Administration proposed that Austin and San Antonio build a joint regional airport. That idea was rejected, as few Austinites supported driving halfway to San Antonio on Interstate 35 to catch a flight. Afterward, the city submitted a proposal to the United States Air Force for joint use of Bergstrom Air Force Base in 1976. The Air Force rejected the proposal in 1978 as being too disruptive to its operations.

In the 1980s, neighborhoods around Mueller applied enough political pressure to force the city council to choose a site for a new airport from locations under consideration. In November 1987, voters approved a referendum designating a site near Manor. The city began acquiring the land but faced lawsuits from the Sierra Club and others concerned about the Manor location and its potential environmental impact.

The plans to construct a new airport at the Manor location were abandoned in 1991 when the Base Realignment and Closure Commission selected Bergstrom AFB for closure and gave the nod to the city for the land and runways to be converted for use as a civilian airport. The USAF also agreed not to demolish the existing facilities, including the nearly-pristine main runway. The city council decided to abandon the original plan to build the new airport near Manor and resolved instead to move the airport to the Bergstrom site. The City of Austin hired John Almond—a civil engineer who had recently led the airport design team for the new airport expansion in San Jose, California—as Project Director for the new $585  million airports in Austin and to put together a team of engineers and contractors to accomplish the task. The issue of a $400 million bond referendum for a new airport owned and operated by the city was put to a public vote in May 1993 with a campaign managed by local public affairs consultant Don Martin and then-Mayor Bruce Todd and was approved by 63% of the vote. Groundbreaking for the new airport began in November 1994.

On October 23, 1995, with a $10 million budget and after the old tower, previously used by the US Air Force, "was demolished", construction began on building Austin's tallest primary building that houses air traffic controllers. The new tower, completed a year before current president Bill Clinton arrived with his entourage, enabled Air Force One to be granted clearance to land. This made the president the "first passenger" to arrive at the new airport.

The Air Force's main runway, 17R/35L, was kept intact along with most of its taxiways, as its high weight rating and long length would facilitate eventual service by large long-range airliners while reducing construction costs. Bergstom's original secondary runway, 17L/35R, was closed and partially demolished to allow new taxiway sections to directly connect the main runway to the terminal complex. A replacement 9,000-foot 17L/35R was built to the east of the terminal site, along with a general aviation complex on the southern half of the property. Most of the existing military buildings, including the original control tower, were demolished and cleared to make way for the new terminal and substantial parking facilities, though a hangar complex and parking tarmac to the south was retained, along with a section of tarmac to the northeast of the primary runway which became the foundation for the airport's freight terminal. A few other existing bridges were converted to access roads for ground vehicles, while the family housing area to the northwest would be leveled, but some of the roads were kept for a Texas Department of Transportation service facility. Several Travis County facilities near the airfield, including the county correctional facility and sheriff's training academy, were unaffected by the conversion project.

Bergstrom had the location identifier of BSM until Mueller's final closure in 1999 when it took Mueller's IATA code of AUS. Initial issues with flight scheduling and routing led to proposed plans to keep Mueller operating in parallel with Bergstrom for a few weeks, but residents near Mueller blocked such efforts by appealing to the FAA, who refused to delay the transfer of the AUS identifier or to issue a new airport code for Mueller. Austin–Bergstrom opened to the public on May 23, 1999.

Opening 

Austin–Bergstrom International Airport opened to the public on May 23, 1999, with a  runway, among the nation's longest commercial runways. However, ABIA was expanded during construction to have 24 contact gates with jet bridges (named Gate 2-Gate 25) and one gate without a jet bridge (named Gate 1) for a total footprint of 660,000 sq ft.

The opening of the airport coincided with a considerable number of nonstop flights being operated into Austin from the Dallas–Fort Worth metroplex, as American Airlines had decided to compete with Southwest Airlines' scheduled service between Dallas Love Field (DAL) and Austin in addition to American and Delta Air Lines service between Dallas–Fort Worth International Airport (DFW) and AUS.  At the time, there were 42 nonstop flights every weekday being operated with mainline jet aircraft from the two primary airports located in the Dallas/Fort Worth metroplex to Austin. By contrast, this same OAG lists a combined total of 24 nonstop flights every weekday at this time from the two primary airports serving the Houston area, Hobby Airport (HOU) and Intercontinental Airport (IAH), to Austin.

Recent history 
As the population and economic importance of Austin has grown in recent years, airlines have been introducing new nonstop flights to the airport instead of routing passengers through existing hubs in Dallas and Houston, causing dramatic growth in both passenger numbers and nonstop service at Austin–Bergstrom.

The terminal's first expansion project was completed in the summer of 2015. It added an enlarged customs and immigration facility on the arrivals level capable of processing more than 600 passengers per hour, two domestic baggage claim belts, and an enlarged security checkpoint on the ticketing level. In 2019, a $350 million addition to the east side of the terminal added nine new gates, increasing the total number of gates from 25 to 34. These gates are spaced farther apart, to accommodate additional flights operated by larger aircraft. Gates 1+3 and Gates 2+4 are able to act independently of each other when accommodating narrow body aircraft, or as one gate's Door A and Door B in a dual jet-bridge configuration when larger, wide-body aircraft arrive providing boarding options. The number of flexible-use gates that can accommodate both international and domestic flights increased from two to six.

The airport's first schduled transatlantic service, to London–Heathrow, was inaugurated by British Airways in March 2014.

To accomidate the airport's rapid growth, a three-gate South Terminal opened on April 13, 2017. The terminal was built at a cost of US$12 million by a private company, LoneStar Airport Holdings, under a 40-year lease. The terminal reused a building from the Bergstrom Air Force Base, adding outdoor waiting areas and a food-truck retail area. The gates are hardstands, without jet bridges, and are used exclusibely by ultra low-cost carriers Allegiant Air and Frontier Airlines.

The impact of the COVID-19 pandemic on aviation prompted deeper flight cuts at Austin–Bergstrom than at Love Field and Hobby Airport, but in November 2021, American Airlines began a major increase in flights from Austin–Bergstrom that will result in American carrying daily traffic rivaling that of Southwest Airlines, the long dominant carrier at the airport. American scheduled many direct flights between Austin and major markets rather than focusing on flights to its domestic hubs as it had in the past, and as part of its expansion plans, the airline began construction of a new  Admirals Club lounge. The increase in flights made Austin–Bergstrom once again the busiest non-hub airport in Texas, eclipsing both Hobby and Love by substantial margins.

In 2022, AUS set an all-time record in its 23-year history, serving 21,089,289 passengers, up 55.40% compared to 2021. May was the busiest month at Austin-Bergstrom overall in 2022, with 2,021,747 passengers served.

Future 
In the coming years, AUS will be undergoing a major expansion with the goal of supporting 31 million passengers by 2040 (vs 11 million when opened in 1999). To accommodate this growth, AUS will optimize the current Barbara Jordan Terminal while building out a new midfield concourse. Additionally, two new taxiways will be constructed to accommodate the resulting increase in aircraft movements. The AUS 2040 Master Plan was finalized in 2019, however work was halted due to the COVID-19 pandemic and a new plan was launched in July 2021, which adapted the 2040 Master Plan to account for the effects of the pandemic.

The first phase of the plan will add remote hardstand gates served by buses from the main terminal. The southeast side of the terminal apron will be reconfigured to accommodate up to six aircraft boarding positions. Initially, buses will operate from a temporary gate 13 and the airport plans to build a more extensive busing gates facility near Gate 11. These hardstand gates are quick to build, but cause additional operational challenges, so they are seen as a short-term solution, and will only be used during peak hours.

The second phase of the plan will extend the west side of the Barbara Jordan Terminal to add either three gates, to replace gates would be taken out of service during construction during the third phase of construction. During the first two phases, the airport's security checkpoint and ticketing areas would be expanded, and the baggage handling system would be modernized.

The third and most ambitious part of the plan would add a new midfield concourse (Concourse B), connected to the existing Barbara Jordan Terminal (Concourse A) with an underground pedestrian tunnel. Concourse B would initallly have 10 gates, but could be expanded to a total of 32 gates to accommodate future growth.

The third phase would requre the demolition of the South Terminal, leading to a lawsuit from it's operator, LoneStar Airport Holdings. The company says the airport is violating the 40-year lease agreement it signed in 2016, and said that it had invested about $50 million in building and operating the terminal. In 2023, a court agreed with LoneStar, ruling that the airport would need to pay $90 million in damages to break the lease.

Facilities

Terminals 

The Barbara Jordan Terminal is the airport's main terminal and has a total of 34 gates, six of which are capable of handling international flights. There are several restaurants and food concessions inside the terminal, all but two of which are located inside the secured gate areas of the terminal. The terminal also has a live music stage on which local bands perform in keeping with the spirit of Austin's proclamation as "The Live Music Capital of the World."

A secondary terminal with three gates known as the South Terminal is used by ultra low-cost carriers Allegiant Air and Frontier Airlines. The South Terminal is accessed from a separate entrance on the south side of the airport perimeter from Burleson Road; it cannot be accessed from either the main airport entrance from SH 71 or the Barbara Jordan terminal except by completely exiting the airport grounds. A shuttle bus runs between the two terminals and the trip between the terminals takes between 15 and 20 minutes. The facility has a retro look and passenger gates are not equipped with jet bridges; passengers walk under a covered walkway to board the aircraft by stairs.

Ground transportation and access

Parking 
The Barbara Jordan Terminal has two parking garages and six surface lots. The Red Garage is directly connected to the terminal building and charges the highest prices. The Blue Garage is located northwest of the terminal and is connected to the Red Garage. The six surface parking lots, lettered B through G, are located north of the Blue Garage, and are branded as economy lots for their lower prices. The economy lots can be reached on foot or by shuttle buses.

For drivers picking up passengers, there is a cell phone lot on the northern end of the airport grounds. In addition to free parking, the area also has a retail center with a convenience store, several fast food outlets, and a Texaco gas station.

The South Terminal has five surface lots. The premium lot is located directly in front of the terminal lot and charges the highest prices. The close-in lot is located northeast of the terminal building and is available by pre-paid reservation only. The three economy lots are located east of the close-in lot and charges the lowest price. The economy lots can be reached on foot or by shuttle buses. The South Terminal also has a cell phone lot, however it lacks the retail options of the main terminal.

Public transportation 
Route 20, operated by the Capital Metropolitan Transportation Authority, operates from the arrivals level of the Barbara Jordan Terminal every 15 minutes. The route takes passengers through the East Riverside Corridor to Downtown and University of Texas at Austin before heading east along Manor Road.

Through the Project Connect plan, the airport is planned be the southern terminus of the Capital Metropolitan Transportation Authority Blue Line light rail, which will run through the East Riverside Corridor to Downtown Austin and The University of Texas at Austin as far north as North Lamar/US183. Blue Line construction costs are estimated at $1.3 billion and may be completed as early as 2029. The project (Proposition A) was approved by voters on November 3, 2020.

Rental car facility 
The airport offers a consolidated rent-a-car center (ConRAC) in a parking garage northeast of the Barbara Jordan Terminal and connected to the Red Garage. Ten rental car companies have passenger service counters on the second floor of the ConRAC, which can service up to 5,000 vehicles per day. The  facility opened in October 2015 and was built at a cost of US$162 million. A shuttle bus travels between the South Terminal and the ConRAC.

Taxi and rideshare services 
Part of the ConRAC's ground floor serves as a "Ground Transportation Center" providing passengers access to taxis and ridesharing companies including Uber and Lyft.

Airlines and destinations

Passenger

Cargo

Statistics

Top destinations

Airline market share

Airport traffic

Accidents and incidents 
 March 1, 2002: During an instrument landing system (ILS) approach in bad weather, a Beechcraft A36 Bonanza, registration number N7236L, crashed on airport grounds and burned out after the pilot initiated a missed approach. The aircraft was destroyed and the pilot and single passenger were killed. The accident was attributed to "The pilot's failure to maintain airspeed, resulting in a stall.  Contributing factors were the low ceiling, fog, and the unforecast weather conditions."
 December 7, 2009: A Piper PA-46-500TP, registration number N600YE, impacted terrain near Mendoza, Texas, in a steep descending right turn during an ILS approach in low visibility, substantially damaging the aircraft and killing the pilot and single passenger. Immediately prior to the crash, an air traffic controller had instructed the pilot to perform a "combination of descending turns" and "heading changes [that] were rapid [and] of large magnitude..." Additionally, post-crash toxicological tests of the pilot found evidence of diphenhydramine, a sedating antihistamine. The accident was attributed to "The pilot's spatial disorientation, which resulted in his loss of airplane control. Contributing to the pilot's spatial disorientation was the sequence and timing of the instructions issued by the air traffic controller. The pilot's operation of the airplane after using impairing medication may also have contributed."
May 7, 2020: An adult male pedestrian trespassed on the airport's runway 17R and was hit and killed by Flight 1392, a Boeing 737-700 operated by Southwest Airlines, as it landed.  There were no injuries to passengers or crew, however the plane sustained damage to its left engine nacelle. The victim was not authorized to be on the runway at the time.
February 4, 2023: A FedEx cargo plane attempting to land on runway 18L had to abort the landing and go around when a Southwest Airlines flight was cleared for departure on the same runway and had already begun its takeoff roll. A subsequent tweet from the NTSB described the incident as a "possible runway incursion and overflight involving airplanes from Southwest Airlines and FedEx."

References

External links 

 Austin–Bergstrom International Airport (official site)
 SpottersWiki The Ultimate Airport Spotting Guide: Austin–Bergstrom International Airport
 Official maps
 
 

1999 establishments in Texas
Airports established in 1999
Airports in Texas
Buildings and structures in Travis County, Texas
Transportation in Austin, Texas
Transportation in Travis County, Texas
Airports in Greater Austin